Blackrock is an unincorporated community in York County, Pennsylvania, United States. Blackrock is located near the Mason–Dixon line approx. 1 mile northwest of the town of Lineboro.

References

Unincorporated communities in York County, Pennsylvania
Unincorporated communities in Pennsylvania